Class 305 may refer to:

 305 series, a train operated in Japan
 British Rail Class 305, a train formerly operated in the UK

See also
 305 (disambiguation)